Listed here are notable ethnic groups and native populations from the Oceania (Pacific Islands and Australia) and East Indonesia by human Y-chromosome DNA haplogroups based on relevant studies.

See also
Oceania
Languages of Oceania
Demographics of Oceania
List of Oceanian countries by population

Notes

References

External links
Y-DNA Ethnographic and Genographic Atlas and Open-Source Data Compilation

Oceania